Arthur Fleming may refer to:

 Art Fleming (Arthur Fleming Fazzin, 1924–1995), American actor and television host
 Arthur H. Fleming (1856–1940), Canadian-American lumber operator and philanthropist
 Arthur Fleming (electrical engineer) (1881–1960), English electrical engineer, researcher director, and engineering educator
 Arthur Fleming-Sandes (1894–1961), British recipient of the Victoria Cross for action in WWI
 Richard Arthur Fleming, American travel writer, brother of Katherine Elizabeth Fleming

See also
Arthur Flemming (1905–1996), American government official
Arthur S. Flemming Award, award recognizing outstanding U.S. federal employees
 Arthur F. Andrews (Arthur Fleming Andrews, 1876–1930), American cyclist
 Arthur Fleming Morrell (1788–1880), British naval officer and explorer
 Fleming (disambiguation)
 Arthur (disambiguation)